Umut Sönmez (born 20 June 1993) is an Azerbaijani footballer who plays for İnegölspor. He plays as a midfielder, and can work in both an offensive and creative role.

Career
Sönmez is a youth product of the German side FC Augsburg, and made his senior debut with their reserves in 2013. He followed that up with a stint at FC Memmingen, before moving to Turkey with Orduspor and Gaziantep BB. In 2016, he made his professional debut with Süper Lig side Kayserispor, He followed that up with successive stints at Adana Demirspor, Manisa, Tuzlaspor, 24 Erzincanspor, Pendikspor, and Sakaryaspor.

International career
Sönmez was born in Turkey to parents of Azerbaijani descent, and was raised in Germany. He debuted for Azerbaijan U21 in a friendly 1-1 tie with Moldova U21 on 5 March 2014.

References

External links

1993 births
People from Muş
Citizens of Azerbaijan through descent
Turkish people of Azerbaijani descent
Sportspeople of Azerbaijani descent
Living people
Azerbaijani footballers
Azerbaijan under-21 international footballers
Turkish footballers
Association football midfielders
FC Augsburg II players
FC Memmingen players
Orduspor footballers
Gaziantep F.K. footballers
Kayserispor footballers
Adana Demirspor footballers
Manisa FK footballers
Tuzlaspor players
24 Erzincanspor footballers
Pendikspor footballers
Sakaryaspor footballers
İnegölspor footballers
Regionalliga players
Süper Lig players
TFF First League players
TFF Second League players
Oberliga (football) players
Turkish expatriate footballers
Expatriate footballers in Germany
Turkish expatriate sportspeople in Germany
Azerbaijani expatriate footballers
Azerbaijani expatriate sportspeople in Germany